XESORN-AM is a radio station on 610 AM in Saltillo, Coahuila, Mexico. It is owned by Grupo M and known as Viva Saltillo.

History
XESORN was awarded in the IFT-4 radio auction of 2017 and began testing on July 18, 2018. The 610 frequency had previously been occupied by XESAC-AM.

References

Radio stations in Coahuila
Radio stations established in 2018
2018 establishments in Mexico